Vernonia colorata is a species of plant in the family Asteraceae. It is endemic to tropical and southern Africa.

References

colorata